The 2010 A-Lyga was the 18th edition of Lithuania's women's football league. It was won for the 6th year in a row by Gintra-Universitetas Siauliai, which won all 12 games.

References

A Lyga (women)
Lith
Lith
Women